Debipur R. L. Saha High School is a center for secondary and senior secondary education. It is located at Ratua I block, Debipur in Malda, West Bengal, India.

References 

High schools and secondary schools in West Bengal
Schools in Malda district
Educational institutions established in 1963
1963 establishments in West Bengal